John Anthony Mackswith (born 1948, Islington, London) is an English sound engineer.

Since the late 1960s, he has engineered the recordings of an array of notable performers at Landsdowne Studios & Utopia Studios in London and at various studios in Israel, New York City, Canada and the Netherlands.

Discography

Sound engineering on

 1966: "Art Gallery" – The Artworks 
 1967: "Let's Go to San Francisco" – The Flower Pot Men
 1967: "A Walk In The Sky" – The Flower Pot Men
 1968: "The Voice and Writing of Raymond Froggatt" – Raymond Froggatt
 1969: "Where Do You Go To (My Lovely)?" – Peter Sarstedt
 1969: Peter Sarstedt – Peter Sarstedt
 1969: As Though It Were A Movie – Peter Sarstedt
 1969: A Way of Life – The Family Dogg 
 1971: Coming from Reality - Sixto Rodriguez
 1972: Grave New World – Strawbs
 1973: "Sugar Baby Love" – Rubettes
 1975: L'Ete Indien (Africa) / Moi J'Ai Dit Non – Joe Dassin
 1978: The Roger Whittaker Christmas Album  – Roger Whittaker
 1978: PS – Peter Sarstedt
 1979: Knock on Wood – Amii Stewart
 1982: Lost And Found (Dave Bartram solo tracks recorded 1982-1985 at Utopia) released 2011
 1983: Deep Sea Skiving - Bananarama.
 1985: Politics of Existing – Paul Young
 1990: Auberge – Chris Rea

Filmography

Sound engineering on
 1987: (Film) Withnail and I – David Dundas & Rick Wentworth 
 1995: (TV) The Infiltrator 
 2000: (TV) This Is Personal: The Hunt for the Yorkshire Ripper

References

English audio engineers
Living people
1948 births